Patience Mather Cleveland (May 23, 1931 – May 27, 2004) was an American film and television actress.

Biography
Cleveland was born in New York City, the youngest of six siblings, to an old established New Hampshire family, where she was raised. Her older brother was James Colgate Cleveland.  Her parents were Dr. Mather Cleveland, M.D., and his wife, Susan Colgate Cleveland. Her father authored New Hampshire and the Civil War and The Orthopedic Service at St. Luke's Hospital, New York City, 1859–1968. Her family has longstanding ties to Colby-Sawyer College, where the family papers, including her own, are archived.

A children's book that she wrote, The Lion Is Busy, was published in 1963. She made appearances in many television shows, including Seinfeld, Everybody Loves Raymond, That's Life, The Drew Carey Show, Angel, ER, along with voice acting in other shows such as Harvey Birdman, Attorney at Law, as well as many television commercials. She acted in several feature films, including playing the reclusive Roberta Sparrow, also known as "Grandma Death", in the 2001 cult film Donnie Darko.

Cleveland married French-born American character actor  Peter Hobbs on October 24, 1965, in Los Angeles, California. The union was apparently childless and ended in divorce in 1968.

Cleveland died from cancer in Santa Monica, California, four days after her 73rd birthday.

Partial filmography

References

External links
  Photos of Patience Cleveland from the  Cleveland Colby Colgate Archives at Colby–Sawyer College
 Patience Cleveland's diaries by Cleveland Colby Colgate Archives 
 

1931 births
2004 deaths
American film actresses
American stage actresses
American television actresses
20th-century American women writers
Actresses from New Hampshire
Writers from New Hampshire
Deaths from cancer in California
Smith College alumni
Actresses from New York City
Writers from New York City
20th-century American actresses
21st-century American actresses
Miss Porter's School alumni